The International Criminal Court Student Network (ICCSN) is an international student association that brings together young people interested in the International Criminal Court and in international criminal justice. The association aims at enhancing awareness about the Court’s activity and at increasing knowledge of issues of international criminal law. The ICCSN is currently a member of the Coalition for the International Criminal Court.

History
The ICCSN was created in 2006 by students at the London School of Economics, UK and now includes members from six universities in London and the University of Cambridge, the University of Warwick, the University of Utrecht in The Netherlands, and, as of 2011, the University of Oxford. Law students at Duke University established the first U.S. Chapter.  Students at Central Michigan University set up the first chapter at a university without a law school. The first chapter in Canada was opened at McGill University in the Autumn of 2012. In 2014, the first Australian chapter was founded by law students at the University of Western Sydney.

Mission
A fundamental premise of the ICCSN is the idea is that the development of international criminal justice relies on youth’s efforts and consciousness and that the involvement of new generations in the discussion about international justice will help the ICC legal machinery to prove effective.

ICCSN's campaigns are focused on promoting effective compliance with ICC’s actions and decisions amongst Member States, on information dissemination on the cases currently at the attention of the Court, on the arrangement of public debates and the publication of a Journal, Issues in International Criminal Justice.

Activities
Apart from campaigning, the network has hosted numerous speaker events, sent members on a trip to the Hague to visit and learn about the mechanisms of the ICC, and organised the first ever international criminal law meeting in the United Kingdom. The association was also represented as a member of the coalition for the ICC at the Seventh Session of the Assembly of State Parties in November 2008.

The association operates through the work of an Executive Committee, which includes a Director, a Chair, a Secretary, a Treasurer, a Public Relations Officer and an Outreach Officer, directly elected from the members of the association.

References

External links
Official website

Student organizations established in 2006
International Criminal Court